The 2021 Big Sky Conference women's soccer tournament was the postseason women's soccer tournament for the Big Sky Conference held from November 3 to November 7, 2021. The five-match tournament took place at Jackson Stadium, home of the regular-season champions Northern Colorado. The six-team single-elimination tournament consisted of three rounds based on seeding from regular season conference play. The Montana Grizzlies were the defending champions and successfully defended their title by defeating Weber State in the Finals.  This was the sixth overall title for Montana, and the third title for coach Chris Citowicki.  Montana and coach Citowicki have won three of the last four Big Sky Conference Tournaments. As tournament champions, Montana earned the Big Sky's automatic berth into the 2021 NCAA Division I Women's Soccer Tournament.

Seeding 
The top six teams in the regular season earned a spot in the tournament.  Northern Arizona and Weber State finished tied for third, with both teams having a 6–3–0 conference record, but Northern Arizona secured the third seed in the tournament by virtue of defeating Weber State 4–1 on October 8.  Sacramento State and Eastern Washington finished tied for sixth place, with both teams having a 3–6–0 conference record.  Sacramento State won the tiebreaker and qualified for the tournament based on their 4–2 victory over Eastern Washington on October 10.

Bracket

Source:

Schedule

First Round

Semifinals

Final

Statistics

Goalscorers

All Tournament Team

Source:

MVP in bold

References 

Big Sky Conference Women's Soccer Tournament
2021 Big Sky Conference women's soccer season